Serra do Marão located in the border between Trás-os-Montes (District of Vila Real) and Douro Litoral (District of Porto) regions, is the sixth highest mountain in Continental Portugal, rising up to 1415 meters.

References

in Língua Portuguesa com Acordo Ortográfico [em linha]. Porto: Porto Editora, 2003-2015. [consult. 2015-12-31 22:41:16]. Available on Internet: http://www.infopedia.pt/$serra-do-marao?uri=lingua-portuguesa-aao/chumbo

Mountain ranges of Portugal